A partial solar eclipse occurred on December 15, 1982. A solar eclipse occurs when the Moon passes between Earth and the Sun, thereby totally or partly obscuring the image of the Sun for a viewer on Earth. A partial solar eclipse occurs in the polar regions of the Earth when the center of the Moon's shadow misses the Earth. Occurring only 2.7 days before apogee (Apogee on December 18, 1982), the Moon's apparent diameter was smaller.

Related eclipses

Eclipses in 1982 
 A total lunar eclipse on January 9.
 A partial solar eclipse on January 25.
 A partial solar eclipse on June 21.
 A total lunar eclipse on July 6.
 A partial solar eclipse on July 20.
 A partial solar eclipse on December 15.
 A total lunar eclipse on December 30.

Solar eclipses of 1982–1985

Metonic cycle

References

External links 

1982 12 15
1982 in science
1982 12 15
December 1982 events